Michael Corcoran (1847 – October 3, 1919) was a United States Army corporal with the 8th Cavalry Regiment who received the Medal of Honor during the Indian Wars. Corcoran's award was issued March 3, 1870, for gallantry in action at Agua Fria River, Arizona, on August 25, 1869.

Corcoran died October 3, 1919, and is interred at Calvary Cemetery in Cleveland, Ohio.

Medal of Honor citation
Rank and organization: Corporal, Company E, 8th U.S. Cavalry. Place and date: At Agua Fria River, Ariz., August 25, 1869. Entered service at: ------. Birth: Philadelphia, Pa. Date of issue: March 3, 1870.

Citation:

Gallantry in action.

See also

List of Medal of Honor recipients
List of Medal of Honor recipients for the Indian Wars

References

1847 births
1919 deaths
American military personnel of the Indian Wars
United States Army Medal of Honor recipients
Military personnel from Pennsylvania
United States Army soldiers
Burials in Calvary Cemetery (Cleveland)
American Indian Wars recipients of the Medal of Honor